Richard David Gruenwald (January 22, 1917 – February 24, 2010) was a provincial level politician from Alberta, Canada. He served as a member of the Legislative Assembly of Alberta from 1971 to 1975 sitting with the Social Credit caucus in the official opposition.

Political career
Gruenwald ran for a seat to the Alberta Legislature in the 1971 Alberta general election. He won the new electoral district of Lethbridge-West by a wide margin defeating two other candidates to pick it for the Social Credit party who had been defeated from government in that election.

He ran for a second term in office in the 1975 Alberta general election but was defeated in the three way race by Progressive Conservative candidate John Gogo after his popular vote collapsed, he finished a distant second place.

References

External links
Legislative Assembly of Alberta Members Listing

Alberta Social Credit Party MLAs
2010 deaths
1917 births